Gregg Hale is an American film producer, best known for producing The Blair Witch Project and starring in the documentary film of Blair Witch, The Woods Movie. Director of segment "A Ride in the Park" in V/H/S/2.

Personal information
He was born in Selma, Alabama but considers Henderson, Kentucky his hometown.  He went to Western Kentucky University for a year, before dropping out to serve for four years in the U.S. Army.  After leaving the service, he moved to Orlando, Florida where he went to film school at Valencia College and the University of Central Florida (class of 1995). He then worked as a set dresser and prop man on features and TV shows in Orlando and Los Angeles for ten years, before producing The Blair Witch Project. He currently lives in Portland, Oregon with his wife, Adrian, child, Cupid, and son, Deckard.

References

External links

https://web.archive.org/web/20091012053439/http://www.kentuckyliving.com/article.asp?articleid=2674&issueid=333 (Kentucky Living Magazine - October 2009).
http://www.haxan.com/ (haxan films).

Year of birth missing (living people)
Living people
American film producers
Independent Spirit Award winners
People from Selma, Alabama
Western Kentucky University alumni
Film producers from Alabama
United States Army soldiers
University of Central Florida alumni
Filmmakers from Portland, Oregon